is a Japanese field hockey player who plays for Dutch club HGC and the Japan national field hockey team as a forward.

International career
He was a part of the Japan squad which won the gold medal at the 2018 Asian Games. He was named the Player of the Tournament at the 2021 Men's Asian Champions Trophy where they won the silver medal.

Club career
Before the 2018 Asian Games he played club hockey for Japanese club Minoshima Club. After those Asian Games he joined Dutch club HGC.

References

External links

1988 births
Living people
Japanese male field hockey players
Male field hockey forwards
Field hockey players at the 2020 Summer Olympics
Olympic field hockey players of Japan
Field hockey players at the 2014 Asian Games
Field hockey players at the 2018 Asian Games
Asian Games medalists in field hockey
Medalists at the 2018 Asian Games
Asian Games gold medalists for Japan
HGC players
Expatriate field hockey players
Japanese expatriates in the Netherlands
Sportspeople from Shiga Prefecture
21st-century Japanese people